Coos people are an indigenous people of the Northwest Plateau, living in Oregon. They live on the southwest Oregon Pacific coast. Today, Coos people are enrolled in the following federally recognized tribes: 
 Confederated Tribes of the Coos, Lower Umpqua and Siuslaw Indians of Oregon
 Confederated Tribes of Siletz Indians of Oregon
 Coquille Indian Tribe.

Language
The Coos language is dormant. It belongs to the Coosan language family, and is divided into two dialects: Hanis language and Miluk language. The Confederated Tribes of Coos, Lower Umpqua and Siuslaw has a language program to revitalize the language.

History
Their neighbors were Siuslauan, Kalapuyan, and the Umpqua Indians. The total population of Hanis and Miluk Coos in 1780 has been estimated to be around 2,000. 

On February 8, 1806 the Coos people were first mentioned by Euro-Americans. William Clark, wintering at Fort Clatsop near the Columbia with Meriwether Lewis and the Corp of Discovery, reported the existence of the "Cook-koo-oose nation". His journal entry stated: "I saw several prisoners from this nation with the Clatsops and Kilamox, they are much fairer than the common Indians of this quarter, and do not flatten their heads." 

The Coos joined with the Umpqua and Siuslaw tribes and became a confederation with the signing of a Treaty in August 1855. In 1857, the U.S. Government removed the Coos Indians to Port Umpqua. Four years later, they were again transferred to the Alsea Sub-agency at Yachats Reservation where they remained until 1876. In 1876, the sub-agency was handed over to white settlement and the Indians were assigned to relocate to the Siletz Reservation, which created a major disruption among the tribal members. By 1937, their population had dwindled to 55.

In 1972, Hanis and Miluk Coos, along with members of the Kuitsh and Siuslaw tribes, incorporated as the Coos Tribe of Indians. In subsequent years, they began providing food assistance for low-income families and established job placement and drug and alcohol abuse programs.

Culture
There were 40–50 villages in the Coos tribes (they lived around the Coos bay and North Bend area). Most of them were hunters, fishermen, and gatherers. For entertainment, they held foot races, canoe races, dice (bone or stick) games, target practice, and also shinny (field hockey).

Namesakes
Several Oregon landmarks are named after the tribe, including Coos Bay, the city of Coos Bay, Oregon, and Coos County.

Notable Coos people
 Annie Miner Peterson (1860–1939), last speaker of the Miluk language

See also
Coosan languages

Notes

References
 Pritzker, Barry M. A Native American Encyclopedia: History, Culture, and Peoples. Oxford: Oxford University Press, 2000.

Further reading
 Leo J. Frachtenberg, "Coos," in Franz Boas (ed.), Handbook of American Indian Languages, Part 2. Washington, DC: U.S. Government Printing Office, 1922; pp. 297–430.

External links
Confederated Tribes of Coos, Lower Umpqua, and Siuslaw, official website
Languages of Oregon: Coos
Coos, Lower Umpqua & Siuslaw Tribes profile
Coos Texts, collection of origin myths and lore by Leo J. Frachtenberg (1913), on Internet Sacred Text Archive

 
Indigenous peoples of the Northwest Plateau
Native American tribes in Oregon
Confederated Tribes of Siletz Indians